Suyamvaram is a 1999 Indian Tamil-language comedy drama film starring an ensemble cast from actors in the Tamil film industry and shot by a large technical team from the industry. The film was planned by Giridharilal Nagpal who produced and wrote the film's story and brought together 14 major directors, 19 cinematographers and over thirty leading actors in the Tamil film industry.

The film also holds the Guinness World Record for casting the most stars in a film and also for being the quickest ever feature-length film made, with filming being completed in 23 hours and 58 minutes. The film released on 16 July 1999, to positive reviews from critics, praising the intentions of the makers.

Plot 
Kuselan (Vijayakumar) and his wife Suseela (Manjula Vijayakumar) are the heads of a large family which consists of their three sons - Arunachalam (Sathyaraj), Aavudaiyappan (Prabhu) and Indiran (Abbas) - and six daughters - Urvashi (Rambha), Easwari (Roja), Uma (Kasthuri), Aishwarya (Maheswari), Hema (Preetha Vijayakumar), and Ezhilarasi (Suvalakshmi). Azhagappan (Parthiban) is the family's loyal servant, while Krishna (Napoleon) is their family doctor.

The movie opens with Kuselan's 60th birthday celebrations, but he gets a heart attack. At the hospital, the family is informed that Kuselan will not live long and decides to keep him comfortable in his last days. From the devastated family, Kuselan asks for one last favour: all his children get married before he dies. The children agree, and a statewide ad is put out saying that those chosen to marry Kuselan's children would get a piece of the family properties and a crore in cash. Needless to say, the mention of wealth brings in potential brides and grooms by the truck full to be interviewed by either Gnanapithan (K. Bhagyaraj) and Arivozhimangai (Urvashi) or the doctors Mithrabuthan (Janagaraj) and Panchabootham (Senthil).

Kuselan, Suseela, and Krishna are happy upon thinking that everything would happen as planned, but there is a major hitch that they did not know about: most of the children have already fallen in love. Arunachalam, Aavudaiappan, and Indiran have fallen love with Khushbu, Savithri (Ishwarya), and Heera respectively. Easwari, Uma, Aishwarya, and Hema are in love with Kanna (Prabhu Deva), Pallavan (Pandiarajan), Gautham (Vineeth), and Kanthen (Livingston) respectively. Each of them gets their lover ready for the interview, and after some hard work and bribing, they are all selected. Urvashi is linked with the absent-minded doctor Ram Kumar (Karthik), who shows up at the interview upon thinking it is an interview for a doctor's post in a clinic while Ezhilarasi pairs with Azhagappan.

Kabilan (Mansoor Ali Khan), with Vichitra (Vichithra) in tow, tries to worm his way in as a groom, and when that effort fails, he kidnaps the nine brides for ransom. Krishna calls his friend ACP Sanjay IPS (Arjun Sarja), who defeats Kabilan and his aides, defuses the bomb planted by Kabilan at the marriage hall and saves the brides.

After finding the brides and after the marriage, Kuselan explains that his heart attack was a joke, and he wanted them to get married.

Cast
In order of appearance:

Crew
 Directors: J. Paneer, A. R. Ramesh, Keyaar, E. Ramdoss, Arjun, Guru Dhanapal, Liaquat Ali Khan, R. Sundarrajan, Selva, K. Subash, Sundar C, Siraj, K. S. Ravikumar, P. Vasu
 Screenplay & dialogues: Siraj
 Story & producer: Giridharilal Nagpal
 Music Composers: Deva, S. A. Rajkumar, Sirpy, Vidyasagar
 Cinematographers: Babu, Raghunatha Reddy, B. L. Rao, D. Shankar, K. S. Selvaraj, A. Karthik Raja, Ashokrajan, K. S. Udhayashankar, C Vijayasri, M. V. Panneerselvam, U. K. Senthil Kumar, R. B. Imayavaramban, Ram Gunasekharan, R. Rajarathnam, R. H. Ashok, K. B. Ahmed, G. Mohan, Victor S. Kumar
 Editors: P. Sai Suresh, K. Thanikachalam, P. Madan Mohan, L. Kesavan
 Art Director: G. K

Production
Producer Giridharilal Nagpal announced his intentions of making, Suyamvaram, a film shot within 24 hours in January 1999, citing it had been a fourteen-year dream. The film's launch occurred in January 1999 with Rajinikanth and Kamal Haasan in attendance. The makers originally planned on making the entire film on 24 March 1999, but the making was delayed and there were major changes made to the agreed cast and crew. The delay meant that some lead actors that had initially agreed to part of the film such as Vijayakanth, Murali, Prashanth and Prakash Raj, had to opt out. Lead actresses Simran, Devayani and Keerthi Reddy, and directors R. K. Selvamani, S. A. Chandrasekhar and P. Vasu also eventually did not feature.

Nagpal then announced his intentions of shooting the film within 24 hours on 5 and 6 April 1999 across film studios in Chennai. Along with Nagpal, the film brought together 19 associate directors, 45 assistant directors, 19 cameramen, 36 assistant cameramen, nine steadycam operators, 14 heroes, 12 heroines, villains, comedians, five dance masters, 16 assistants, 140 chorus dancers, stunt coordinators, art director, makeup, costume and set designers, 15 film units, a still photographer and 1,483 extras to make the film. Despite months of planning, Nagpal left many details to the last minute with no script produced and directors describing scenes to actors, who would rehearse them once before filming. Two representatives, on behalf of the Guinness World Records, were present to oversee the time-schedule. They were joined by representatives from the Limca Book of Records on the set. Giridharlal said, "The goal is to finish every stage of film-making within the stipulated 24 hour period, Shooting, developing rushes, editing, dubbing, re-recording and final mixing for the master copy will all be done in that time. The script is being divided into 11 parts, and one director will shoot one part, all of them working on the same day, at different sets and venues".

Production began on 5 April at 7 am on the sixth floor of the AVM Studios and then the AVM Gardens directed by Sundar C. At 9.30am scenes were shot at the Kamaraj Memorial involving Prabhu Deva and Roja, while at 11am scenes with Sathyaraj and Khushbu were shot in studios resembling a gypsy tent camp. At noon in Film City, a song sequence with Abbas and Heera was shot and at Guindy, Ramdoss shot scenes involving Pandiarajan and Kasthuri. P. Vasu filmed scenes involving Prabhu and Aishwarya in a room with computers at 2.45pm, after a brief delay caused by missing props. Karin Przygocki, an English teacher at the American International School Chennai, was recruited to play an American who marries into a traditional Indian family but her role was later changed to that of a jilted lover in Prabhu's office. A dance sequence at a discothèque in Abu Palace was shot at 5.30pm with Vineeth and Maheswari, and by 6.30pm, the entire team assembled at the Vijaya Vauhini studios, which was designed to look like a wedding hall, for the final scenes to be canned. At 3am on 6 April, the film ran two hours behind schedule and four directors improvised and changed the storyline with two scenes being cut and planned into one. Furthermore, at 3am, Vineeth refused to shoot for a scene where he was locked in the bathroom, and time was lost when the directors attempted to convince him to continue with the shoot. At 6.25am, the team finished filming the kidnap scenes at Kushaldoss House. The filming finished at 6.50am on 6 April 1999 with ten minutes to spare.

Director Sundar C, who shot the opening scene of the film, revealed that all the directors of the film had "several sittings together and had planned everything in advance". While, P. Vasu claimed that all the directors were constantly in touch with each other so that one scene smoothly merged into the other. Actor-director, Arjun appeared as a cop in the film as well as directing and coordinating the action scenes in the film's climax. Costume designer S. V. Kumar worked on the film with forty assistants, while dance choreographer Lalita Mani worked on some of the film's songs. Art director, G. K., was in charge of co-ordinating sets at all 21 locations and managed to keep in control of events through his mobile phone; while Giridharilal's son Vinay, scooted from location to location, ensuring that the project was developing smoothly.

Release
The film was released on 16 July 1999 to positive reviews from critics, K. N. Vijiyan of New Straits Times wrote, "The cast seems to have enjoyed themselves tremendously doing this movie. So will you, too". Shobha Warrier of Rediff.com claimed the attempt "particularly praiseworthy if we take into consideration the time factor and the amount of co-ordination the film-makers had to do", whilst adding that the movie was "slicker and better made than many churned out regularly by some film factories". A reviewer from Indolink.com cited  that "it is a laudable venture" and "they have even tried to have a storyline for this movie". In regard to the technical aspects the critic claimed that "the songs are okay — nothing to rave about". A critic from Sify.com noted "it can be seen for its record achievement feat but entertainment it does not offer." Kalki praised the directors for covering every portion into a full length film and every scene seem like watching a new film.

The film was dubbed into Telugu as Pellante Idera! by P. R. Kutumba Rao and released in October 2001. Rao was persuaded to release the film in Telugu by Narasimha Rao of the Raasi Movies studio, while Vennelakanti worked on the Telugu dialogues and music was rearranged by G. Anand. The makers of the Telugu version opted to select a different voice artist for each character, rather than save costs by using individuals who can provide multiple voices. A Hindi remake of the film was pondered by the producer, but later shelved. Inspired by the film, the producers later announced their next project, which would feature five actors and actresses, to be shot within ten days, but the project did not proceed.

Soundtrack

The soundtrack consists of five songs composed by four music directors. Lyrics were written by Mu. Metha, Palani Bharathi, Ponniyin Selvan and Ilakkiyan. Actor Prabhu Deva featured as a singer in the soundtrack.

References

External links
 

1999 films
Films about Indian weddings
Indian comedy-drama films
1990s Tamil-language films
Films directed by R. Sundarrajan
Films directed by K. S. Ravikumar
Films directed by P. Vasu
Films directed by Sundar C.
Films directed by Arjun Sarja
Films scored by Deva (composer)
Films scored by Vidyasagar
Films scored by S. A. Rajkumar
Films scored by Sirpy
Films directed by E. Ramdoss